The Politically Incorrect Parenting Show is an Australian television program which is a remake of the New Zealand television program of the same name. The Australian version was filmed in Sydney from 16 to 25 February 2010. It was hosted by Nigel Latta, a New Zealand-born psychologist, who has written several books on parenting. It aired on the Nine Network.

Nine Network original programming
2010 Australian television series debuts
2010 Australian television series endings